Apasa is an islet east of Ithaca, one of the Echinades (Modia subgroup), an island group in the Ionian Sea in Greece. As of 2011, it had no resident population.

References

External links
 Apasa on GTP Travel Pages (in English and Greek)

Islands of the Ionian Islands (region)
Echinades
Islands of Greece
Landforms of Cephalonia